Ganda is a town and municipality in Benguela Province in Angola. The municipality had a population of 235,486 in 2014.

History
During the colonial period, the town was called Vila Mariano Machado having been promoted to such category on June 24, 1969.

Transport

Railway
It lies on the central line of Angolan Railways where there is a junction.

References

Populated places in Benguela Province
Municipalities of Angola